The 50 kilometre cross-country skiing event was part of the cross-country skiing at the 1936 Winter Olympics programme. It was the fourth appear]ance of the event. The competition was held on Saturday, 15 February 1936. Thirty-six cross-country skiers from eleven nations competed.

Medalists

Results

References

External links
Official Olympic Report
 

Men's 50 kilometre
Men's 50 kilometre cross-country skiing at the Winter Olympics